Johanne Fritz-Petersen (18 October 1879 – 22 December 1961) was a Danish actress. She appeared in more than 60 films between 1912 and 1938.

Selected filmography
 Den kulørte Slavehandler (1914)
 The End of the World (1916)
 Blaavand melder storm (1938)

References

External links

1879 births
1961 deaths
Danish film actresses
Place of birth missing